Diaphania fuscicaudalis is a moth in the family Crambidae. It was described by Heinrich Benno Möschler in 1881. It is found in Brazil and Ecuador.

The length of the forewings is 13.2–14 mm for males and 14.6 mm for females. There are dark-brown costal and external bands on the forewings and the wing disc is white with a light purple gloss and some yellowish scales in the anal margin. There is an external brown band on the hindwings.

References

Moths described in 1881
Diaphania